James Mackey is a professional poker player.

James Mackey may also refer to:
James Mackey (mayor) (1813–1892), Lord Mayor of Dublin
James Mackey (theologian), Catholic theologian
James Page Mackey (1913–2009), chief of police
Biz Mackey (James Raleigh Mackey), American catcher and manager in Negro league baseball
Jim Mackey (1897–1990), English footballer
Jim Mackey (administrator), British NHS executive

See also
James Mackie (disambiguation)
James Mackay (disambiguation)
James McKay (disambiguation)